Linda Coleman-Madison is a Democratic member of the Alabama Senate, representing the 20th District since 2006. Previously she was a member of the Alabama House of Representatives from 2003 through 2006.

External links
Alabama State Legislature – Senator Linda Coleman official government website
Project Vote Smart – Senator Linda Coleman (AL) profile
Political profile at Bama Politics
Follow the Money – Linda Coleman
2006 2002 1998 campaign contributions

Democratic Party Alabama state senators
Democratic Party members of the Alabama House of Representatives
Living people
African-American state legislators in Alabama
African-American women in politics
Politicians from Birmingham, Alabama
Year of birth missing (living people)
Women state legislators in Alabama
21st-century American politicians
21st-century American women politicians
21st-century African-American women
21st-century African-American politicians